Wolfgang Weber (born 26 June 1944) is a German former footballer best remembered for scoring the last-minute equaliser for West Germany in the 1966 World Cup final.

Playing career 

Weber, a central defender with 1. FC Köln in 356 Bundesliga matches, poked the ball home with almost the last kick of the game at Wembley in 1966 to make the score 2–2. Opponents England went on to win 4–2 in extra time.

Weber played for Köln between 1963 and 1978 and won 53 caps for his country, scoring just one other goal. He also represented West Germany at the 1968 European Championships and the 1970 World Cup. His last appearance for his country was in 1974.

Later life 

From summer 1978 until his dismissal in January 1980, Weber coached the Bundesliga side Werder Bremen but was sacked in the relegation struggle of the North German side in his second season. His successor Fritz Langner, who acted in cooperation with Rudi Assauer, could not avoid the drop to the 2. Bundesliga in the later stages of Bremen's 1979–80 campaign.

In retirement, Weber has been involved with the German branch of the Special Olympics.

References

External links 

 
 
 

1944 births
Living people
People from Sławno
People from the Province of Pomerania
German footballers
West German footballers
Association football defenders
Germany international footballers
Germany B international footballers
1. FC Köln players
Bundesliga players
1966 FIFA World Cup players
1970 FIFA World Cup players
German football managers
SV Werder Bremen managers
Bundesliga managers
Recipients of the Cross of the Order of Merit of the Federal Republic of Germany